Uniclass 2015 is a unified classification system for all sectors of the UK construction industry. It contains consistent tables classifying items of all scales, from entire systems such as a railway to individual product items such as anchor plates, flue liners or LED lamps.

Originally released in 1997, Uniclass allowed project information to be structured to a recognised standard. The original version was later heavily revised, to make it more suitable for use with modern construction industry practice, and to make it compatible with Building information modeling (BIM) processes.

History
Uniclass was created in 1997 by the Construction Project Information Committee (CPIC), a UK industry organisation with representatives from key institutions including the Royal Institute of British Architects and the Royal Institution of Chartered Surveyors. A voluntary standard classification system for the construction industry, it was intended to help organise information throughout design and construction processes. A standard classification facilitates interoperability between different systems.

Early versions were criticised for not being unified, for inconsistencies between the labelling and depth of tables, for poor integration of civil engineering and building works, and for being an essentially paper-based system. Uniclass 1.4 was superseded by Uniclass 2 in 2013.

Uniclass 2015 development
Led by the National Building Specification (NBS), experts from across the industry developed Uniclass 2015, extending the scope and responding to industry feedback on Uniclass 2.

Uniclass 2015 provides:
a unified classification system for the construction industry - for the first time, buildings, landscape and infrastructure could be classified under one unified scheme
a hierarchical suite of tables that supported classification from a university campus or road network to a floor tile or kerb unit
a numbering system flexible enough to accommodate future classification requirements
a system compliant with ISO 12006 that is mapped to NRM1 and supports mapping to other classification systems in the future
a classification system that will be maintained and updated by NBS.

Uniclass 2015 provides a means of structuring project information essential for the adoption of BIM. Information about a project can be generated, used and retrieved throughout the built asset life cycle.

Uniclass 2015 was carefully structured to be in accordance with ISO 12006-2 Building construction – Organization of information about construction works – Part 2: Framework for classification. It is therefore particularly suited to use in an international context, mapping to other similarly compliant schemes around the world.

Application
Uniclass 2015 is divided into a set of tables, each accommodating a different 'class' of information. These can be used to categorise information for costing, briefing, CAD layering (consistent with ISO 13567), etc. as well as when preparing specifications or other production documents.

These tables are also suitable for buildings and other assets in use, and maintaining asset management and facilities management information.

The tables
The suite of tables are broadly hierarchical, and allow information about a project to be defined from the broadest view of it to the most detailed. For detailed design and construction, the main starting point are Entities, which are composed of Elements; Elements are made up of Systems which in turn contain Products.

Entities can also be described using the Spaces and Activities tables if required, and at the more general level the Complexes table contains terms that can be thought of as groupings of Entities, Activities and Spaces. The tables comprise:

Complexes: a Complex describes a project in overall terms. It can be a private house with garden, drive, garage and tool shed, or it can be a University campus with buildings for lecturing, administration, sport, halls of residence, etc. Rail networks and airports are also examples of complexes
Entities: Entities are discrete things like buildings, bridges, tunnels etc. They provide the areas where different activities occur
Activities: this defines the activities to be carried out in the complex, entity or space. For example, a prison complex provides a Detention activity at a high level, but can also be broken down into individual activities like exercise, sleeping, eating, working, etc.  The Activities table also includes surveys, operation and maintenance and services
Spaces/Locations: in buildings, spaces are provided for various activities to take place. In some cases a space is only suitable for one activity, for example a kitchen, but a school hall may be used for assemblies, lunches, sports, concerts and dramas. Also classed as spaces are transport corridors that run between two locations, such as the railway between London Kings Cross to Newcastle, or the M1 from London to Leeds
Elements and functions: elements are the main components of a structure like a bridge (foundations, piers, deck) or a building (floors, walls and roofs). Functions cover things like lighting, heating and water: general requirements that are not yet designed
Systems: Systems are the collection of components that go together to make an element or to carry out a function. For a pitched roof, the rafters, lining, tiles, ceiling boards, insulation and ceiling finish comprise a system, or a low temperature hot water heating system is formed from a boiler, pipework, tank, radiators etc.
Products: finally, the individual products used to construct a system can be specified, e.g. joist hangers, terrazzo tiles, gas fired boilers.

Using the classification system
The tables need to be flexible and to be able to accommodate sufficient codings to ensure coverage, to allow for a multitude of items and circumstances, including new technologies and developments that are yet to emerge.

Each code consists of either four or five pairs of characters. The initial pair identifies which table is being used and employs letters. The four following pairs represent groups, sub-groups, sections and objects. By selecting pairs of numbers, up to 99 items can be included in each group of codes, allowing plenty of scope for inclusion.

For example, Systems are arranged in groups with subgroups which are sub divided, which leads to the final object code.  For instance:

SS_30 Roof, floor and paving systems
SS_30_10 Pitched, arched and domed roof structure systems
SS_30_10_30 Framed roof structure systems
SS_30_10_30_25 Heavy steel roof framing systems

or

SS_50 Disposal systems
SS_50_75 Wastewater storage, treatment and disposal systems
SS_50_75_67 Primary sewage treatment and final settlement systems
SS_50_75_67_46 Lamella tank systems

Notes and references

External links
NBS
Digital Plan of Work

Trade and industrial classification systems
Construction documents